Wallis Annenberg Hall (or simply Annenberg Hall)
is a $150 million building at the University of Southern California, dedicated to "media education, communication and production." Dean Ernest Wilson has stated that the new building for the USC Annenberg School for Communication and Journalism is intended to facilitate collaboration between students and faculty, as part of a larger initiative to reform and modernize within the school.

References 

University of Southern California buildings and structures
Articles containing video clips